Nonantum (from Massachusett "I bless it"), also known as Silver Lake or The Lake, is one of the thirteen villages within the city of Newton in Middlesex County, Massachusetts, United States, located along the Charles River at the site of a former lake. The village is one of the centers of Italian population in Newton. The commercial area has numerous restaurants and food establishments featuring Italian cuisine.

History 
in the 1600s, Nonantum was a Native American settlement and an early site of missionary work by John Eliot at the home of Waban, often identified as the first Massachusett to convert to Christianity. Nonantum was the first village of "praying Indians" gathered by Eliot, for which it was given the name "I bless it." European settlers later claimed ownership of this land and divided it into small farms, eventually supplanting Native Americans at this site through disease, migration, and King Philip's War.

Starting in 1778, when a paper mill was established by David Bemis on the Charles River at Bridge Street, industrial uses replaced farming, and Nonantum became a site for production of cottons, woolens, and rope. Industrial work brought Irish, French Canadian, Italian, and Jewish immigrants to the village.

Silver Lake was a site of winter recreation for neighborhood children, who cleared the snow each winter and played hockey on it through the 1950s. It was filled with construction rubble and built over from the 1930s until its total demise in 1971.

Lake Talk

Lake Talk is a cryptolect spoken particularly among older Italian-American residents. The origins of Lake Talk are unclear. A 2001 article in the Boston Globe speculated that it is a blend of Italian and some World War II code, but others have seen similarities to Angloromani or Italian Romany slang. In the late 1800s and early 1900s natives of Castelvenere, a town and comune in the Province of Benevento, Campania region, Italy, settled in Nonantum, the first Italian immigrants. Many people in the village now who claim they were the first to discover the "Lake" are descendants of natives of San Donato Val di Comino in the Province of Frosinone, Lazio, Italy.

According to the article, examples of words and phrases in Lake Talk include:

mush (pronounced to rhyme with push) -- "guy" or "man", can be positive or negative depending on context
wicked pissa, mush! -- "extremely awesome, man"
chabby -- "boy child", possibly related to the Romany word chavvie = "boy"
chor'd -- "stolen", possibly related to the Romany word choro = "thief"
chuccuo -- (chu-co, also pronounced as "chew-ch") -- "donkey", "horse's ass"
cuya moi -- "shut up" or "go to hell"
divia (div-ya) -- "crazy", "jerk, screw-up, or harmless screwball," can be used as a noun or an adjective: "The mush is a real divya," or "This mush is divya"
inga -- "unattractive" or "bad-tempered person" or "junk" or "crap"
jival -- "chick" or "woman", female version of mush
mush has a cormunga in his cover -- "guy is hiding a gun"
mush is the earie -- "the guy is listening"
over-chay or overchay (ova-chay) -- "it's a lie" or "he's an actor." Directly translates as "overkill." Better defined as exaggeration or equivocation
oy -- "eat"
pissa -- "awesome"
pukka to the mush -- "tell the guy"
quister jival (quest-ah jival) -- "pretty woman"
quister (also pronounced as "quish-ta") meaning awesome, good, beautiful
quister mush (quest-ah mush) -- "good, standup guy"
shapdude (shup-dude) -- "how's it going?"
wonga -- "money," "That mush has a lotta' wonga"
geech -- "go away"
gash -- "feminine man"
jawl -- "steal" or "look at"
dikki ki dotti -- "unreal or unbelievable"
minje -- "dirty or unattractive woman"
suv -- "to have sexual relations"
corey"-- "the male sexual organ"chooch -- "friend", "buddy"24-911"-- "Meet me in the Store 24 parking lot immediately"

Former Massachusetts State Auditor Joe DeNucci, a Nonantum native, told the Globe:

You talk the Lake language and only people from there can understand you.  An awful lot of what it means is how you say it and how you use it.  You improvise a lot, mixing it with carnival talk and bebop.

"Mush is the earie."  That means "The guy is listening."

Lake talk is not confined to the neighborhood.  Nonantum students have spread it to Newton North High School, which serves the area.

Notable residents
Marianne Leone Cooper, actress
A. Joseph DeNucci, politician and former professional boxer
Matt LeBlanc, actor

See also
List of Registered Historic Places in Newton, Massachusetts

References

External links

 http://www.thelakelingo.com

Villages in Newton, Massachusetts
Villages in Massachusetts